Attachmate Corporation is a 1982-founded software company which focused on secure terminal emulation, legacy integration, and managed file transfer software. Citrix-compatibility and Attachment Reflection were enhanced/added offerings.

History and products

Attachmate Corporation

Attachmate was founded in 1982 by Frank W. Pritt. It focused initially on the IBM terminal emulation market, and became a major technology employer in the Seattle area.

KeaTerm
KEAsystems' KEAterm products were PC software packages that emulated some of Digital Equipment Corporation's VT terminals, and facilitated integrating Windows-based PCs with multiple host applications. These included KEAterm VT340 and VT420 terminal emulators, and KEA X X terminal software).

KEA was acquired by Attachmate.

DCA IRMA

Another acquisition was Digital Communications Associates (DCA), makers of IRMA line of terminal emulators, INFOconnect, Crosstalk communications software, and OpenMind collaborative software). DCA was also known for its 3270 IRMA hardware product  (used for SDLC), and ISCA SDLC hardware adapters. They also supported driver downloads.

Extra!
The Attachmate Extra! family of terminal emulator packages was built to include 3270, 5250 and VT100.

Acquisition 
After buying both WRQ, Inc. and Attachmate, who had been long-time competitors in the host emulation business, a group of private equity firms announced in 2005 that the companies would be merged under the new ownership. It was announced that Attachmate founder and CEO Frank Pritt would retire at the same time.

IBM, RedHat, Microsoft, Attachmate, Apache, Cisco, NEC, SAP, Software AG, Adobe Systems, Fujitsu, Oracle, CA Technologies and BonitaSoft,  are some of the key players operating in the Global Application Server Market.

References

External links  	
 Micro Focus Attachmate page
 Attachmate File Library, Archive.org

1982 establishments in Washington (state)
2005 disestablishments in Washington (state)
2005 mergers and acquisitions
Defunct software companies of the United States
Software companies based in Seattle
Software companies established in 1982
Software companies disestablished in 2005